Madhava Panikkar may refer to:
 K.M. Panikkar (1895-1963), Indian journalist, historian and diplomat
 Madhava Panikkar, a member of the Niranam poets of the 14th and 15th centuries